The Fujifilm X-T30 is a mirrorless interchangeable-lens camera announced by Fujifilm on February 14, 2019. The X-T30 is a successor to the X-T20, which was released in 2017. It is sold in three finishes: black, silver (as shown in the photo here) and charcoal silver.

The X-T30 was succeeded by the XT-30 II which was announced on September 2, 2021.

Differences from the X-T20
The Fujifilm X-T30 inherits a number of the key features found in the Fujifilm X-T20.

 X-Trans CMOS 4 sensor
 Increased sensor resolution to 26.1 megapixels (6240 × 4160 pixels)
 Joystick for autofocus point selection
 Hybrid autofocus system with 425 phase-detect autofocus points across the entire frame
 Increased speed of burst shooting to 20 fps when using the electronic shutter, or 30 fps in 1.25 crop mode (16.6 MP)
 High speed 100 and 120 fps video modes at 1080p for slow motion video
 Eterna film simulation mode
 Automatic focus bracketing function
 F-Log Gamma video mode at 4:2:2 10 bit via HDMI

References

External links

X-T30
Cameras introduced in 2019